The American sitcom television series Black-ish has received many awards and nominations since it premiered on September 24, 2014.

American Film Institute

Cinema Audio Society Awards

Critics' Choice Television Awards

GLAAD Media Awards

Golden Globe Awards

Hollywood Critics Association

Kids' Choice Awards

MTV Movie & TV Awards

NAACP Image Awards

Peabody Award

People's Choice Awards

Primetime Emmy Award

Producers Guild of America Awards

Rockie Awards

Satellite Awards

Screen Actors Guild Awards

TCA Awards

Teen Choice Awards

Young Artist Awards

References

Awards
Black-ish